The 1888 Moradabad Hail was a severe hailstorm that occurred on 30 April 1888 in Moradabad, in the Indian state of Uttar Pradesh. It had the highest mortality associated with a hailstorm, and killed 246 people, 1600 cattle and sheep with hailstones as large as “goose eggs and oranges and cricket balls. The hailstones were reportedly as big as oranges and in some places accumulated to up to 2 feet in height.

References

Moradabad district
1888 in India
1888-04
Natural disasters in India
Disasters in Uttar Pradesh
1888 disasters in India